The 1925 Chattanooga Moccasins football team was an American football team that represented the University of Chattanooga (now known as the University of Tennessee at Chattanooga) as a member of the Southern Intercollegiate Athletic Association (SIAA) during the 1925 college football season. In their first year under head coach Frank Thomas, the team compiled a 4–4 record.

Schedule

References

Chattanooga
Chattanooga Mocs football seasons
Chattanooga Moccasins football